Michael Wood (born 19 August 1936) is professor emeritus of English at Princeton University. He is a literary and cultural critic, and an author of critical and scholarly books as well as a writer of reviews, review articles, and columns.

He was director of the Gauss Seminars in Criticism at Princeton from 1995 to 2001, and chaired Princeton's English department from 1998 to 2004. He contributes to literary publications such as The New York Review of Books and the London Review of Books, where he is also an editorial board member and writes a column, "At the Movies." Wood also teaches at Middlebury College's Bread Loaf School of English in Vermont during the summers.

Prior to teaching at Princeton, he taught at Columbia University in the Department of English and Comparative Literature, lived briefly in Mexico City, then took the chair of English at the University of Exeter in Devon, England.

In addition to countless reviews, he also has written books on Nabokov, the trans-historical appeal of the oracle from the Greeks to the cinema, on the relations between contemporary fiction and storytelling, and on figures in the modern cultural pantheon including Luis Buñuel, Franz Kafka, Stendhal, Gabriel García Márquez and W. B. Yeats. He is a Fellow of the Royal Society of Literature, and a member of the British Academy, the American Academy of Arts and Sciences, and the American Philosophical Society.

Early life and education
Michael George Wood was born in Lincoln, England. He obtained his BA in 1957 in French and German from St John's College, Cambridge, and his PhD in 1962, also from Cambridge, for a thesis entitled The Dramatic Function of Symbol in Maeterlinck and Claudel.

Career
From 1964 to 1982 Wood taught at Columbia University, becoming Professor of English and Comparative Literature, and he then took up the Professorship of English Literature at the University of Exeter (1982–95). In 1995 he was appointed Charles Barnwell Straut Class of 1923 Professor of English and Comparative Literature at Princeton University, which post he held until his retirement in 2013.

Personal life
Wood lives in New Jersey with his wife, Elena Wood Uribe, and has three children: Gaby Wood, the literary director of the Man Booker Prize, Patrick Wood, CEO of Util,  and Tony Wood, former editor at the New Left Review and author of Chechnya: The Case For Independence.

Selected works
Stendhal (Cornell University Press, 1971)
America in the Movies (Basic Books, 1975)
García Márquez: One Hundred Years of Solitude (Cambridge University Press, 1990)
The Magician's Doubts: Nabokov and the risks of fiction (Chatto and Windus, 1994)
Children of Silence: on contemporary fiction (Columbia University Press, 1998)
Belle de Jour (British Film Institute Publishing, 2001)
The Road to Delphi: the Life and Afterlife of Oracles (Farrar Straus and Giroux, 2003)
Franz Kafka (Northcote House/British Council, 2004)
Nation, Language, and the Ethics of Translation, editor with Sandra Bermann (Princeton University Press, 2005)
Literature and the Taste of Knowledge (Cambridge University Press, 2005)
Yeats and Violence (Oxford University Press, 2010)
Film: A very short introduction (Oxford University Press, 2012)
Alfred Hitchcock: The Man Who Knew Too Much (Houghton Mifflin Harcourt, 2015)
On Empson (Princeton University Press, 2017)

References

External links
Princeton University Department of English: Michael Wood
Michael Wood at The New York Review of Books
Michael Wood interviewed by Noel King
Michael Wood interview at Not Coming To A Theater Near You
Michael Wood at Bookforum

Living people
Alumni of St John's College, Cambridge
Fellows of the Royal Society of Literature
Literary critics of English
Columbia University faculty
Princeton University faculty
Fellows of the American Academy of Arts and Sciences
1936 births
Corresponding Fellows of the British Academy